The NLPC-P60 RNA motif is a conserved RNA structure that was discovered by bioinformatics.
NLPC-P60 motif RNAs are found in Streptomyces.

NLPC-P60 motif RNAs likely function as cis-regulatory elements, in view of their positions upstream of protein-coding genes.  The RNAs are consistently located upstream of genes encoding examples of the conserved protein domain known as "NlpC/P60". The biochemical function of this domain is unknown, but it is found in lipoproteins.  Additionally, genes encoding this domain are often regulated by riboswitches that sense the signaling molecule cyclic di-AMP.  However, no associated between the NLPC-P60 RNA motif and cyclic di-AMP has been established.

References

Non-coding RNA